The 1998–99 Ukrainian Amateur Cup  was the third annual season of Ukraine's football knockout competition for amateur football teams. The competition started on 25 October 1998 and concluded on 17 June 1999.

This also was the first season of amateur cup football competitions that was administered by newly created (in 1998) Ukrainian Football Amateur Association.

Teams

Notes:
 Druzhba-Klib Ukrainy two years ago played as Druzhba-Elevator
 SC Truskavets last year played as Spartak Truskavets

Three regions that were represented last season, chose not to participate in the competition among which are such oblasts Cherkasy, Rivne, and Kiev City. Instead there returned representatives from three oblast among which are Khmelnytskyi, Kiev, and Odesa as well as two new oblasts Luhansk and Poltava.

Competition schedule

First qualification round

Second qualification round

Quarterfinals (1/4)

Semifinals (1/2)

Final

See also
 1998–99 Ukrainian Football Amateur League
 1998–99 Ukrainian Cup

External links
 1998–99 Ukrainian Amateur Cup  at the Footpass (Football Federation of Ukraine)

Ukrainian Amateur Cup
Ukrainian Amateur Cup
Amateur Cup